Privodino is an urban locality (a work settlement) in Kotlassky District of Arkhangelsk Oblast, Russia, located on the left bank of the Northern Dvina River  from Kotlas. Municipally, it is the administrative center of Privodinskoye Urban Settlement, one of the three urban settlements in the municipal district. Population:

History
Privodino was first mentioned as a selo in 1726. In the 19th century, it was the seat of Privodinskaya Volost, a part of Velikoustyugsky Uyezd of Vologda Governorate. In 1918, the area was transferred to the newly formed Northern Dvina Governorate, and in 1924 the uyezds were abolished in favor of the new divisions, the districts (raions). Privodino was included into Kotlassky District which was formed on June 25, 1924. In 1929, Northern Dvina Governorate was merged into Northern Krai, which in 1936 was transformed into Northern Oblast. In 1937, Northern Oblast was split into Arkhangelsk Oblast and Vologda Oblast.

On April 26, 1941, Privodino was granted work settlement status. In 2004, it was municipally incorporated as Privodinskoye Urban Settlement.

Economy

Transportation
While the Northern Dvina is navigable, there is no regular passenger traffic.

Privodino is located on the highway connecting Kotlas with Veliky Ustyug (and eventually Vologda and Kostroma). There is regular passenger bus traffic.

Close to the settlement, there is a railway line connecting Yadrikha and Veliky Ustyug, with the Razyezd 15 km passing loop where the only train using the line used to stop before the passenger traffic was shut down in 2005.

Privodino has an oil-pumping station in the Baltic Pipeline System.

See also
Administrative divisions of Arkhangelsk Oblast

References

Notes

Sources

Urban-type settlements in Arkhangelsk Oblast